Khasur is a hamlet on the northeastern outskirts of Taqah in Dhofar Governorate,  in southwestern Oman.

References

Populated places in the Dhofar Governorate